Hynhamia albicorpus is a species of moth of the family Tortricidae. It is found in São Paulo, Brazil.

The wingspan is about 15 mm. The ground colour of the forewings is cream, suffused with pale brownish cream. The markings are pale brown. The hindwings are cream with weak brownish spots in the posterior area.

Etymology
The specific name refers to the colouration of the species and is derived from Latin corpus (meaning body) and albus (meaning white).

References

Moths described in 2011
Hynhamia